Puntsagiin Jasrai (26 November 1933 – 25 October 2007) was a Mongolian politician. He was the Prime Minister of Mongolia from 21 July 1992 until 19 July 1996.

Education and early career
Jasrai was born in 1933 in the Bugat sum of the Govi-Altai Province.  In 1950 he graduated from high school in Tonkhil district of Govi-Altai Province.  He then worked for six years as Education inspector from 1950 to 1956.  During this time he joined the Mongolian People's Revolutionary Party (MPRP) in 1951. In 1961 he graduated from the Moscow Higher School of Economics with a degree in agricultural economics.  From 1970 to 1975, he served as chairman of the State Prices Committee. In 1973 he was elected a deputy of the People's Great Hural for the first of four times from 1973 to 1986.  From 1976 to 1978, he was head of the planning and finance department of the MPRP Central Committee. In 1978 he became first deputy chairman of the State Planning  Commission and in 1984 he was appointed deputy charman of the Council of Ministers. In 1988 he became first deputy chairman of the Council of Ministers.  He became a candidate member of the Politburo in 1989.

In the mid-1980s Jasrai became one of Mongolia's earliest proponents of free market reforms.

With the collapse of communist power in 1990 Jasrai resigned his government and party posts and became president of the Association of Mongolian Production and Services Cooperatives.  In this role he was able to make several consultative visits to foreign countries where he established important contacts for the development of Mongolia's economy.  He was characterized as straightforward and honest.

Prime minister

Jasrai was elected to the Mongolian State Great Hural on June 28, 1992 representing constituency 26 in Ulaanbaatar. At the Hural's first session on 20 July 1992 he was appointed prime minister. Before the selection Jasrai had told the members of the State Great Hural that he was "not a politician, rather a simple Economist" and promised that, if elected, he would work towards the expanding economic development and democracy in Mongolia.

In June 1993 Jasrai visited the United States and met with government representatives and took part in an economic symposium.  He also met with World Bank and International Monetary Fund representatives and spoke at the National Press Club.

In summer 1993 opposition parties strongly criticized Jasrai and his government for not doing enough to prevent a worsening of the economy and they continued calls for his resignation throughout most of his term in office. During this period opposition parties joined to create the Mongolian Democratic Union coalition.  In the July 1996 parliamentary elections, the Democratic Union proved victorious, ushering the first non-MPRP government since Mongolia's independence in 1921.  Mendsaikhany Enkhsaikhan was subsequently appointed Prime Minister.  Jasrai retained his seat in the State Great Hural until 2004.

Death
Jasrai died on 25 October 2007 in Ulan Bator at the age of 73.

References

 Puntsagiin Jasrai Who is who in Mongolian politics (German)

1933 births
2007 deaths
People from Govi-Altai Province
Mongolian People's Party politicians
Prime Ministers of Mongolia
Members of the State Great Khural
Mongolian expatriates in the Soviet Union
Moscow State University of Economics, Statistics, and Informatics alumni